David Peter Walsh (born September 25, 1960) is a former professional baseball pitcher. Walsh pitched in 20 games for the Los Angeles Dodgers of Major League Baseball (MLB). during the 1990 baseball season.

Career
He graduated from El Camino Real High School (Woodland Hills, California) in 1978, where he played varsity baseball and earned All-Los Angeles City honors as a pitcher in his senior year. He went on to play baseball at the University of California, Santa Barbara, (UCSB) and was drafted by the Toronto Blue Jays after his career at UCSB. After his career at UCSB, he was drafted to the Los Angeles Dodgers.

After getting his degree in liberal arts, he became a high school English teacher at Putnam city high school. He later worked at Santa high school. Afterward, he became the sophomore English teacher at Harding charter preparatory high school. He then became a junior English teacher at the same high school.

External links

1960 births
Living people
Albuquerque Dukes players
American expatriate baseball players in Mexico
Baseball players from Massachusetts
El Camino Real High School alumni
Florence Blue Jays players
Knoxville Blue Jays players
Los Angeles Dodgers players
Major League Baseball pitchers
Medicine Hat Blue Jays players
Mexican League baseball pitchers
San Antonio Missions players
Syracuse Chiefs players
Tecolotes de los Dos Laredos players
UC Santa Barbara Gauchos baseball players
Ventura County Gulls players
Anchorage Glacier Pilots players
Mat-Su Miners players